Tactus may refer to:

 Pulse (music)
 Tactus Records, an Italian classical music label

See also
 Tactusa, genus of moths